Michael Holcombe Wilson  (November 4, 1937 – February 10, 2019) was a Canadian businessman, politician and diplomat who served as minister of finance from 1984 to 1991 and minister of international trade from 1991 to 1993 under Prime Minister Brian Mulroney.

Wilson was a Bay Street investment executive when he was elected to the House of Commons in 1979. He then unsuccessfully ran for the leadership of the Progressive Conservative Party in 1983 before being appointed to Prime Minister Mulroney's cabinet. As a cabinet minister, Wilson introduced the Goods and Services Tax (GST) and helped negotiate the Canada–United States Free Trade Agreement and the North American Free Trade Agreement.

Wilson retired from politics in 1993 and returned back to Bay Street, heading his own consulting and financial services firm. Wilson served as the Chairman of Barclays Capital Canada Inc. from May 2010 until his death in February 2019. He was the Canadian Ambassador to the United States from 2006 until 2009 and the Chancellor of the University of Toronto from 2012 to 2018.

Early life
Born in Toronto, Ontario, Wilson was the son of Constance L. (Davies) and Harry Holcombe Wilson. Wilson attended Upper Canada College and then Trinity College at the University of Toronto, where he joined the Kappa Alpha Society.

Political career
Wilson was a candidate at the 1983 Progressive Conservative leadership convention. He dropped off after the first ballot and urged his supporters to vote for Brian Mulroney, the eventual winner. Mulroney appointed Wilson as minister of finance when the party formed a government after the 1984 election.

Wilson reformed the tax system to broaden the tax base and lower tax rates, removing many special tax provisions, and helped negotiate the Canada–United States Free Trade Agreement. He also announced the Goods and Services Tax in his 1989 budget. Introduced in 1990, the tax which is still in place today and is considered a necessary source of federal income, despite being unpopular with consumers.

In 1991, after seven years as Minister of Finance, Wilson became Minister of Industry, Science and Technology and Minister of International Trade. In that role, he participated in negotiating the North American Free Trade Agreement.

Post-politics

Wilson was not a candidate in the 1993 election, and he returned to Bay Street to head his own consulting and financial services firm. He later rejoined Royal Bank of Canada, and he was Chairman and CEO of RT Capital when that business was sold to UBS AG. Wilson served as Chairman of UBS Canada from 2001 to 2006.

In recent years, he was a spokesman for a lobby group promoting public–private partnerships, and he was the Chairman of the Canadian Coalition for Good Governance. From 2003 to 2007, Wilson served as the Chancellor of Trinity College. In July 2012, he became the Chancellor of the University of Toronto, and he was re-elected to an additional three-year term in 2015.

Wilson was a mental health advocate, having lost a son to depression and suicide. Wilson established the Cameron Parker Holcombe Wilson Chair in Depression Studies at the University of Toronto. He also sat on the board of directors for the Mental Health Commission of Canada.

Wilson was active in many other organizations, including the NeuroScience Canada Partnership, the Centre for Addiction and Mental Health, the Canadian Cancer Society, the Canadian Council for Public-Private Partnerships, the Loran Scholars Foundation, the Canadian Coalition for Good Governance and the Canadian Institutes of Health Research.

On 30 October 2003, Wilson was appointed as an Officer of the Order of Canada. He was promoted to Companion of the Order of Canada in 2010.

On 9 April 2015, it was announced that Wilson was appointed as the new board chair of the Mental Health Commission of Canada. He was also a member of the Trilateral Commission.

Ambassador to the United States

On 16 February 2006, Prime Minister Stephen Harper announced the nomination of Wilson as Ambassador of Canada to the United States of America. He succeeded Frank McKenna in Washington, D.C. Wilson became the 22nd Canadian Ambassador to the United States on 13 March 2006, when U.S. President George W. Bush accepted his credentials.

Allegation of leaks during 2008 Democratic presidential campaign
In March 2008, it was alleged that Wilson told the Canadian media that U.S. presidential candidate Barack Obama was not serious about his promise to opt out of the North American Free Trade Agreement (NAFTA). Liberal MP Navdeep Bains called on Wilson to step down as Canada's ambassador to Washington while the alleged leaks were investigated. Wilson publicly acknowledged that he spoke to then-CTV reporter Tom Clark, who first reported the leaks, before the story aired, but he refused to discuss what was said.

Personal life

Wilson was married to Margie Wilson and was predeceased by son Cameron, who suffered from depression and died by suicide in 1995.
Following his son's death, Wilson devoted considerable time to advocate for mental health. The couple had two other children: son Geoff Wilson and daughter Lara O'Brien, both of whom married and have children. Wilson died from cancer on February 10, 2019.

Archives 
There is a Michael Wilson fonds at Library and Archives Canada.

Electoral record

References

External links
 
 
 

1937 births
2019 deaths
Canadian Ministers of Finance
Ambassadors of Canada to the United States
Progressive Conservative Party of Canada MPs
Members of the 21st Canadian Ministry
Members of the 24th Canadian Ministry
Members of the House of Commons of Canada from Ontario
Alumni of the London School of Economics
Members of the King's Privy Council for Canada
University of Toronto alumni
Upper Canada College alumni
Trinity College (Canada) alumni
Businesspeople from Toronto
Canadian Anglicans
Canadian university and college chancellors
Chancellors of the University of Toronto
Companions of the Order of Canada
Politicians from Toronto
UBS people
Progressive Conservative Party of Canada leadership candidates
Mental health activists